Ali Hassan Majrashi (born 1 October 1999) is a Saudi Arabian footballer who plays as a right back for Saudi Pro League side Al-Ahli.

Career
Majrashi started his career at Al-Shabab and is a product of Al-Shabab's youth system. On 30 January 2018, Majrashi made his professional debut for Al-Shabab against Al-Ahli in the Pro League, replacing Abdulwahab Jaafer. On 11 July 2019, Majrashi signed a five-year professional contract with Al-Shabab. On 30 June 2019, he was chosen in the Saudi scholarship program to develop football talents established by the General Sports Authority. On 7 February 2021, Majrashi joined Al-Faisaly on loan. He started the 2021 King Cup Final on 27 May 2021 helping Al-Faisaly win their first title. On 25 January 2022, Majrashi joined Al-Ahli on a four-year deal.

Honours

Club
Al-Faisaly
King Cup: 2020–21

References

External links
 

1999 births
Living people
Saudi Arabian footballers
Saudi Arabia youth international footballers
Saudi Arabia international footballers
Association football fullbacks
Saudi Professional League players
Saudi First Division League players
Al-Shabab FC (Riyadh) players
Al-Faisaly FC players
Al-Ahli Saudi FC players